The 2016 Tour de France was the 103rd edition of the cycle race, one of cycling's Grand Tours. On 24 November 2014 Amaury Sport Organisation announced that the race will depart, on 2 July 2016, from the French department of Manche, for the first time in the history of the Tour de France. The race had a stage finish in Andorra. The race finished on the Champs-Élysées in Paris on 24 July.

Classification standings

Stage 12 
14 July 2016 — Montpellier to Chalet Reynard (Mont Ventoux), 

The queen stage of the 2016 Tour, on the French National Day of Bastille Day, this mountain stage departed west out of Montpellier before quickly turning north-east to head through Castries and Sommières. The route then zig-zagged east through Vergèze to Bouillargues. Continuing east, the riders travelled through Beaucaire, Tarascon and Saint-Rémy-de-Provence to an intermediate sprint at Mollégès. The route then descended to Mazan and turned east to Bédoin. The riders continued east to begin the ascent of the Hors catégorie Mont Ventoux, at an average gradient of 8.8%, using the southern route to the summit. The finish line was to have been reached at an altitude of  after a  ascent. After a weather forecast of high winds at the summit of Ventoux, the stage was shortened by  the day before.

After the route was shortened, spectators congregated near the new finishing line. Near the end of the race, an attacking group consisting of Chris Froome, Richie Porte, and Bauke Mollema encountered thick crowds along the climb. The crowds forced a motorbike in front of the riders to suddenly stop, causing all three riders to crash.  Mollema was able to get back on his bike and quickly ride off, but Porte and Froome were both delayed, especially Froome, whose bike was damaged in the crash. Leaving his bike behind, Froome then decided to run up Mont Ventoux, before being given a neutral service bike.  Shortly thereafter he was able to get a team bike from his team car. Froome finished the stage 1 minute and 40 seconds behind Mollema, provisionally ceding the yellow jersey to Adam Yates and being placed in sixth. After the incident was reviewed, a jury granted both Froome and Porte the same time as Mollema, who had finished ahead of the main field despite the crash.  This gave Froome the yellow jersey again, and also gave him time on both Yates and Nairo Quintana.

Stage 13 
15 July 2016 — Bourg-Saint-Andéol to La Caverne du Pont-d'Arc,  individual time trial (ITT)

This short stage was an individual time trial on an undulating road, departing north-west and uphill from Bourg-Saint-Andéol. The first time check took place at the  mark at Côte de Bourg-Saint-Andéol. Each rider then headed east through Saint-Remèze, to the second time check at the  mark at Les Arredons. From there, the road took a winding descent to the third time check at the  mark at the Pont d'Arc, with the road then winding north through Vallon-Pont-d'Arc and then uphill east to the finish line at the Caverne du Pont-d'Arc. The route was expected to take each rider around 50 minutes.

The presentation of the jerseys was altered in the wake of the Nice attack. There was no music played, no presentation of sponsors, and all the jersey winners walked onto the stage together, in silence.  Over the next three days, official days of mourning by order of the French government, the presentations were done without the usual podium music.

Stage 14 
16 July 2016 — Montélimar to Villars-les-Dombes Parc des Oiseaux, 

This flat stage departed from Montélimar heading east through Cléon-d'Andran to the Category 4 climb of the Côte de Puy-Saint-Martin. The route then turned north through Crest, Bourg-de-Péage and Margès to the Category 4 climbs of Côte du Four-à-Chaux and the Côte d'Hauterives. The riders continued north through Beaurepaire and Eyzin-Pinet to an intermediate sprint at the Lafayette industrial park to the west of Diémoz. The race continued north around the eastern outskirt of Lyon, travelling through Saint-Quentin-Fallavier, Charvieu-Chavagneux, Jons and Montluel to the finish at the Parc des Oiseaux.

Stage 15 
17 July 2016 — Bourg-en-Bresse to Culoz, 

The route then descended south through Nurieux and Peyriat to Cerdon. Once descended via Anglefort into Culoz, the race travelled back out to the Category 1 Lacets du Grand Colombier at  descending again via Anglefort, before the finish line in Culoz itself.

Stage 16 
18 July 2016 — Moirans-en-Montagne to Bern, 

This medium mountain stage departed from Moirans-en-Montagne heading north to Pont-du-Navoy, where the race turned east for Champagnole and Censeau. Winding east to Malbuisson, the route then took a turn north-east towards Verrières-de-Joux. The riders then entered Switzerland and travelled through Rochefort, Colombier and Neuchâtel before an intermediate sprint at Ins. Following a shallow descent through Frauenkappelen and Köniz was the finish line in Bern.

Rest day 2 
19 July 2016 — Bern

On the second rest day, Mark Cavendish and Rohan Dennis withdrew from the race to concentrate on their preparations for the men's omnium and the men's road time trial, respectively, at the 2016 Summer Olympics.

Stage 17 

20 July 2016 — Bern to Finhaut-Émosson, 

This mountainous stage departed from Bern heading south through Wattenwil to Reutigen, where the race turned west for Oberwil im Simmental and Boltigen. The race then headed south to ascend the Category 3 Côte de Saanenmöser and descended east to the plateau at Rougemont. After descending south-west to the valley floor at Aigle, the race turned south to travel through Saint-Maurice to an intermediate sprint at Martigny.

Stage 18 
21 July 2016 — Sallanches to Megève,  individual time trial (ITT)

The shortest stage of the tour was an individual time trial on mountainous road. The riders departed west from Sallanches to Domancy, where the climb began. Carrying on north, the first time check took place at the  mark at the Côte de Domancy. The road then wound uphill west to the second time check at the  mark at Combloux. From there, the riders continued uphill north-west to the third time check at the  mark at Les Berthelets. The route was expected to take each rider around 32 minutes.

Stage 19 
22 July 2016 — Albertville to Saint-Gervais Mont Blanc, 

This mountainous stage departed from Albertville winding west over the unclassified  and then descending north through Faverges. The race then turned north-west towards Doussard, where there was an intermediate sprint. Descending through the unclassified Col des Saisies to Notre-Dame-de-Bellecombe and turning north-east on through Megève, the route continued descending to the valley floor at Domancy.

Stage 20 
23 July 2016 — Megève to Morzine-Avoriaz, 

This mountain stage departed from Megeve heading southwest through Praz-sur-Arly to Flumet. After descending through Le Reposoir, the route turned north to the valley floor at Marnaz and Thyez. A winding descent south to Taninges followed, with a turn east through Morillon to Samoëns.

Stage 21 
24 July 2016 — Chantilly to Paris Champs-Élysées, 

This flat stage departed east from Chantilly, heading to Avilly-Saint-Léonard, before doubling back through Vineuil-Saint-Firmin to Gouvieux. The route then headed south through Asnières-sur-Oise, Attainville, Montlignon, Sannois and Franconville to the Category 4 climb of the Côte de l'Ermitage. The riders then descended into Argenteuil and continued south through Courbevoie to Suresnes. Travelling alongside the River Seine, the race reached the Place de la Concorde and passed the Louvre, before turning onto the Rue de Rivoli to enter the usual circuit on the Champs-Élysées. The circuit had eight passes of the finish line, with an intermediate sprint at the top of the Champs-Élysées after the third pass of the line, before the final lap.

References

External links 

2016 Tour de France
Tour de France stages